Exaeretia lutosella is a moth of the family Depressariidae. It is found in Ukraine, Romania, North Macedonia, Croatia, Italy, France, Spain, Portugal, Turkey, Palestine, Syria and Morocco.

The wingspan is about 22 mm.

References

Moths described in 1854
Exaeretia
Moths of Asia
Moths of Europe
Moths of Africa